Aïssa Bekkai (born 14 August 1964) is the Algerian Deputy Minister for Foreign Trade. He was appointed as minister on 2 January 2020.

References 

Living people
21st-century Algerian politicians
Algerian politicians
Government ministers of Algeria
1964 births